Robert William Gladstone (13 September 1879 – 1 June 1951) was a Liberal party member of the House of Commons of Canada. He was born in Oxford, Ontario and became a manager, manufacturer and teacher by career.

After an unsuccessful attempt to win Wellington South in the 1925 federal election, he was elected to Parliament there in the 1935 election. He was re-elected in 1940 and 1945. He was appointed to the Senate in September 1949 thus leaving the House of Commons. He remained in the Senate until his death at Ottawa Civic Hospital on 1 June 1951 due to a heart condition. He was survived by his wife and a son.

Electoral record

References

External links
 

1879 births
1951 deaths
Canadian senators from Ontario
Members of the House of Commons of Canada from Ontario
Liberal Party of Canada MPs
Liberal Party of Canada senators